Ricardo Antonio Hoyos, Jr. (born November 27, 1995) is a Canadian actor. He joined the cast of Degrassi: The Next Generation for the eleventh season as Zig Novak and starred in the sequel series Degrassi: Next Class on Netflix. He has also starred in the children's television series Dino Dan.

Hoyos was born in Alliston, Ontario to a Peruvian father and a Canadian mother. He is the older brother of actor Lucius Hoyos His mother has Irish ancestry.

Filmography

Film

Television

Music Videos

Awards and nominations

References

External links

1995 births
Canadian male child actors
Canadian male film actors
Canadian male television actors
Canadian people of Peruvian descent
Canadian people of Ecuadorian descent
Canadian people of Irish descent
Living people